Lotar may refer to:
 A hand-to-hand combat system related to Kapap
 An alternative spelling for lutar (short for lute guitar)
 The Gimbri of north Africa
 Lotar, Iran, a village
Lotar (name)

See also
{srt}}
Logar (disambiguation)
Lontar (disambiguation)
Lopar (disambiguation)
Lota (disambiguation)
Lotan (disambiguation)
Lothar (disambiguation)